Manuel José Ferreira da Silva Barbosa (born 26 February 1951) is a Portuguese football manager and a former player. 

He played 14 seasons and 345 games in the Primeira Liga, all for Boavista. He is the most capped player in the history of Boavista.

Club career
He made his Primeira Liga debut for Boavista on 7 September 1969 in a game against Vitória de Setúbal.

Honours
Club
 Taça de Portugal winner with Boavista:  1975, 1976, 1979
 Supertaça Cândido de Oliveira winner with Boavista: 1979.

References

External links

1951 births
Living people
Sportspeople from Vila Nova de Gaia
Association football midfielders
Portuguese footballers
Boavista F.C. players
Primeira Liga players
Portuguese football managers
Boavista F.C. managers
Primeira Liga managers
Leixões S.C. managers
U.D. Oliveirense managers
Académico de Viseu F.C. managers
C.D. Aves managers
Shandong Taishan F.C. managers
Portuguese expatriate football managers
Expatriate football managers in China